Wipplinger is a German surname and may refer to the following people:

 Johannes Wipplinger (born 1978), Austrian bobsledder
 Julia Wipplinger (born 1923), South African tennis player
 Leopold Wipplinger, Austrian politician
 Hans-Peter Wipplinger (born 1968), German artist
 Franz Wipplinger (1760–1812), German architect

German-language surnames